Eptesicus is a genus of bats, commonly called house bats or serotine bats, in the family Vespertilionidae. The genus name is likely derived from the Greek words ptetikos 'able to fly' or petomai 'house flier', although this is not certain.

Species 
28 species have been identified within the genus. Of these, 19 are from South America. These species are grouped into two subgenera: Eptesicus and Histiotus.

References

 
Bat genera
Taxa named by Constantine Samuel Rafinesque